The National Institute of Amazonian Research (Instituto Nacional de Pesquisas da Amazônia or INPA) is a public educational and research institution headquartered in Manaus, Brazil. It was founded in 1952, with the purpose of furthering scientific knowledge of the Brazilian Amazon Region. Most of INPA's research focuses on tropical forest management, ecology, molecular ecology, zoology, botany, tropical agriculture and tropical pisciculture. The institution also maintains important vertebrate, invertebrate, and vascular plants research collections.

It also publishes the scientific journal Acta Amazônica.

Graduate programs
Graduate programs offered by INPA:
 Agriculture in the Humid Tropics (Masters and Doctorate)
 Botany (Masters and Doctorate)
 Ecology (Masters and Doctorate)
 Entomology (Masters and Doctorate)
 Tropical Forestry (Masters and Doctorate)
 Climate and Environmental Sciences (Masters and Doctorate)
 Genetics, Conservation and Evolutionary Biology (Masters and Doctorate)
 Freshwater Biology and Inland Fisheries (Masters and Doctorate)
 Aquaculture (Masters)
 Management of Protected Areas in the Amazon (Professional Masters)

See also
List of institutes by region
Reserva Florestal Adolpho Ducke

References

External links
INPA - Instituto Nacional de Pesquisas da Amazônia

Amazonas (Brazilian state)
Amazon basin
Government-owned companies of Brazil
Research institutes in Brazil
Postgraduate schools in Brazil
Universities and colleges in Amazonas (Brazilian state)